Trillium maculatum, the spotted wakerobin or spotted trillium, is a species of flowering plant in the family Melanthiaceae. It is found only in the eastern United States (Alabama, Georgia, South Carolina, North Carolina and northern Florida).

Trillium maculatum is called "spotted" because of irregular dark splotches on the leaves and stems. It is a perennial herbaceous plant that flowers early February to early April. The flower petals are deep red or reddish-purple but occasionally yellow.

Bibliography

References

External links
 Native Florida Wildflowers 
 Wildflowers of the United States
 Atlas of Florida Vascular Plants 
 
 
 Biodiversity Information Serving Our Nation (BISON) occurrence data and maps for Trillium maculatum
 

maculatum
Endemic flora of the United States
Flora of the Southeastern United States
Plants described in 1830
Taxa named by Constantine Samuel Rafinesque
Flora without expected TNC conservation status